Ashari Gill (born 29 July 2002) is an Australian rhythmic gymnast. She won a silver medal in Rhythmic Gymnastics team event, at the 2022 Commonwealth Games.

She competed at the 2018 Australian Championships, 2018 Rhythmic Gymnastics World Championships , 2019 Rhythmic Gymnastics World Championships , and 2022 Oceania Continental Championships.

She trained at the Prahran Rhythmic Gymnastics Specialist Centre.

References

External links 

Australian rhythmic gymnasts
2002 births
Living people
Commonwealth Games silver medallists for Australia
Commonwealth Games medallists in gymnastics
Gymnasts at the 2022 Commonwealth Games
Medallists at the 2022 Commonwealth Games